= Espargaró =

Espargaró is a Spanish surname. Notable people with the surname include:

- Aleix Espargaró (born 1989), Spanish motorcycle racer
- Pol Espargaró (born 1991), Spanish motorcycle racer
